Crnjelovo Donje is a small village located north of the city of Bijeljina in Republika Srpska, Bosnia and Herzegovina.

References

External links
 Bijeljina official website (Serbian)  

Bijeljina
Populated places in Bijeljina